Anja Jacobs (born 1974 in Itzehoe) is a German Film director.

Life and work
In 1998 Anja Jacobs began to study Film direction at the Filmakademie Baden-Württemberg in Ludwigsburg. She finished her study in 2003 with the diploma- and short film Wolf's Ravine. After her study Anja Jacobs realized a few TV movies and series.

Anja Jacobs lives in Berlin.

Filmography (selection)
2001: Dr. Cuddle (Kuscheldoktor), (short film)
2003: Wolf's Ravine (Wolfsschlucht), (short film)
2006: Zores (TV movie)
2007: Verrückt nach Clara (TV series), (Two Episodes)
2008: Cinderella for a Night (Küss mich, wenn es Liebe ist), (TV movie)
2011: Someone Like Him (Einer wie Bruno)

Awards and nominations
2001: Short award for Dr. Cuddle at the AFI Fest
2003: Nomination for Dr. Cuddle at the Student Academy Awards

External links
 

1974 births
Living people
Mass media people from Schleswig-Holstein
People from Itzehoe